Midnight Sun is an extended play (EP) marketed as the sixth single of Japanese boy group JO1, featuring lead track "SuperCali". Consisting of a total of four new songs, the EP single was released digitally by Lapone Entertainment on October 10, 2022, while the three physical editions were released on October 12, 2022. It features the group's frequent collaborators such as Teito, Jung Ho-hyun, Full8loom, Nmore, and Poptime. Midnight Sun became the sixth single of the group that earned number one position on the Oricon Singles Chart and their first single that surpassed 600,000 copies sold in its release week according to Billboard Japan.

Background and release 
On August 25, 2022, during a live Instagram talk session, JO1 announced that their sixth EP single, Midnight Sun, was set to be released on October 12. The concept of the single was set "between dreams and reality" and centered around the message that "in this strange world, we can do everything". It expressed "the pain felt in the process of growing up by likening it to the fear felt in a strange world where night and day is uncertain".

The EP single consists of four songs accompanied with the instrumental version of each song, which were released into three physical editions. The two limited editions each features four tracks and comes with a DVD bundle consisting a variety segment called Weird World (Weird House) and Weird World (Weird Spell), respectively. The normal edition comes with a CD-only and consists of six tracks. A special digital version consisting all songs and an instrumental version of "SuperCali" was released on October 10, 2022.

Lead track  
The lead track "SuperCali" is described to contain "a strong conviction that JO1 will continue to grow and burn with passion in every cell of their body". It was composed in the key of G-sharp minor and 144 beats per minute. The title is abbreviation for the English compound word "supercalifragilisticexpialidocious", popularized by the 1964 film Mary Poppins. The word was introduced as one that "makes infinite possibilities come true" before the song was performed for the first time at the last Fukuoka show of the 2022 JO1 1st Arena Live Tour "Kizuna" on September 22, 2022. "SuperCali" was made available for streaming on midnight the next day along with its performance video, which gained 10 millions views in just two weeks. It was debuted for public on NHK's Utacon on October 4, 2022.
A music video was released on the same day as the release of the single physical editions, which eventually became the first music video of the group to surpass 20 millions views, and went on to reach 39 millions views by the end of October 2022.

The song peaked at number 18 the Billboard Japan Hot 100 and number 14 on the Oricon Combined Singles Chart, before earning second and first place on the two charts, respectively, after the CD release. "SuperCali" topped four chart components on Japan Hot 100 for CD sales, look-up, radio, and Twitter, but lost just shy of 30 points overall "in a fierce battle" against Kenshi Yonezu's "Kick Back". "SuperCali" eventually became the group's first song that spent two weeks in top 6 of Japan Hot 100.

Promotion  
As part of the promotion, JO1 performed "SuperCali" at Rakuten GirlsAward 2022 Autumn/Winter on October 8, 2022. They also performed the Korean version of "SuperCali" and debuted another track from the single "Rose" at KCON 2022 Japan on October 15, 2022. The song was also performed during the group's appearance at the 2022 MTV Video Music Awards Japan and the 2022 MAMA Awards where they received an award for Best Live Performance and Favorite Asian Artist, respectively. Performance videos for the tracks "Rose" and "Phobia" were also subsequently released.

Furthermore, JO1 was selected as the ambassador for the Halloween hashtag event on TikTok Japan, starting from October 17 to November 2, which includes several promotional stunts to further promote "SuperCali". They also held a showcase event in Tokyo on November 4 where they performed three songs from the single alongside one song from their previous single, Wandering, in front of 1,000 fans.

Commercial performance 
Midnight Sun debuted at number one on Oricon Daily Singles Chart with 365,602 copies sold. It eventually managed to be the group's sixth consecutive number-one on the weekly chart with 492,000 copies sold, surpassing their previous single, Wandering, and set a personal record for both physical and combined sales. It also earned JO1 their new personal record on Billboard Japan, topping Top Singles Sales as the group's first single with over 600,000 copies sold on its first week. It was subsequently certified Double Platinum by the Recording Industry Association of Japan. By the end of 2022, the single ranked ninth on the Billboard Japans annual single sales chart with 664,550 physical copies sold.

Track listing 
"SuperCali" and "Phobia" are common tracks 1 and 2 for all editions.

Charts

Weekly charts

Monthly charts

Year-end charts

Certifications

Release history

References 

JO1 songs
2022 songs
2022 singles
Japanese-language songs